The first season of the musical game show Everybody, Sing! premiered on Kapamilya Channel, Kapamilya Online Live, and A2Z on June 5, 2021, and ended on October 10, 2021.

Overview
The game show was first set to premiere on March 15, 2020 on ABS-CBN, replacing Gandang Gabi, Vice!. However, Vice Ganda later revealed in his noontime show It's Showtime that the show was postponed due to the COVID-19 pandemic in the Philippines. The game show later moved its premiere date to June 5, 2021, replacing the third season of Your Face Sounds Familiar.

Gameplay
A community group consists of 25 individuals (usually with ages ranging from 18-59), dubbed as the "Songbayanan," divided equally into five rows. Each row is referred to as "SingKo". Each round, one row will be chosen by the "ChooSera" to play a particular game (includes "The ChooSing One, "Sing In The Blank," "ReverSing," "PicSing a Broken Song," "EngliSing ang Lyrics," "TagaliSing", and "LipSing"). Each game has a different set of mechanics; however, they have the same goal. Each contestant has two guesses to complete a line of a song. They will receive ₱1,000 for each correct guess, and the community group gets an additional 2–4 seconds on the jackpot round's timer. The more correct guesses, the greater the chances of winning the jackpot prize. The community group will then get to participate in the jackpot round ("Everybody GuesSing"), wherein the community group will be naming each song that is being played. If they name all 10 songs, they can share the winning jackpot of ₱500,000.

The ChooSing One

Sing In The Blank

ReverSing

PicSing a Broken Song

EngliSing ang Lyrics

LipSing

Everybody GuesSing

Episodes overview

Statistics
Statistics of performances by every Songbayanan as of February 2, 2023:

Gameplay
This section includes a Songbayanan that shows excellent teamwork since the season's premiere. Only the groups that have a perfect game of a round are only included in this section.

 Groups that had a perfect round of Sing in the Blank: 
 Groups that had a perfect round of The ChooSing One: 
 Groups that had a perfect round of ReverSing: 
 Most number of a Songbayanan'''s SONG-pu that had a perfect score: 

Time Collection & Usage
This section includes the most and least seconds banked by each group, and the fastest time for a group to win the jackpot prize.

 Most seconds banked by a group: 
 Least seconds banked by a group: 
 Fastest time for a group to win: 

Everybody, GuesSing?
This section includes the final outcomes of every group, either good or bad, in the jackpot round.

 Highest answer streaks in a row in Everybody, GuesSing?: 
 Lowest number of correct answers in Everybody, GuesSing?: 
 Groups that almost reached the perfect score in Everybody, GuesSing?'':

References

Notes

ABS-CBN original programming
Filipino-language television shows
Philippine game shows
2021 Philippine television seasons